Louis van den Bogert (14 February 1924 – 20 November 2002) was a Dutch footballer. He played in three matches for the Netherlands national football team from 1951 to 1953.

References

External links
 

1924 births
2002 deaths
Dutch footballers
Netherlands international footballers
Footballers from Utrecht (city)
Association football midfielders
VV DOS players